The 2016–17 Puebla season was the club's 70th professional season in Mexico's top-flight football league. The season is split into two tournaments—the Torneo Apertura and the Torneo Clausura—each with identical formats and each contested by the same eighteen teams. The club also played Supercopa MX.

First-team squad

For recent transfers, see List of Mexican football transfers winter 2016–2017.

Regular season

Apertura 2016 results

Goalscorers

Results

Results summary

Apertura 2016 Copa MX

Group stage

Apertura results

Goalscorers

Results

2016

Regular season

Clausura 2016 results

Attendance 
Puebla's Home Attendance by round, Estadio Cuahutemoc has a sitting capacity of 51,726. 
|}

Goalscorers

Results

Results summary

Clausura 2017 Copa MX

Puebla FC was drawn into Group 4 of the 2017 Clausura 2017 Copa MX alongside Club Atlas and Mineros de Zacatecas.

Group stage

Apertura results

Goalscorers

Álvaro Navarro

Results

References

Puebla
Puebla F.C. seasons